Yangurcha (Yamğırsı) is a rural locality (a selo) and the administrative centre of Yangurchinsky Selsoviet, Sterlibashevsky District, Bashkortostan, Russia. The population was 388 as of 2010. There are 4 streets.

Geography 
Yangurcha is located 22 km northwest of Sterlibashevo (the district's administrative centre) by road. Verkhny Gulyum is the nearest rural locality.

References 

Rural localities in Sterlibashevsky District